Cormier is a French surname.

Geographical distribution
As of 2014, 46.6% of all known bearers of the surname Cormier were residents of Canada (frequency 1:1,439), 38.8% of the United States (1:16,985) and 13.2% of France (1:9,209).

In France, the frequency of the surname was higher than national average (1:9,209) in the following regions:
 1. Saint Pierre and Miquelon (1:133)
 2. Pays de la Loire (1:1,679)
 3. Centre-Val de Loire (1:2,595)
 4. Brittany (1:5,303)
 5. Normandy (1:6,434)
 6. Île-de-France (1:8,172)

In Canada, the frequency of the surname was higher than national average (1:1,439) in the following provinces:
 1. New Brunswick (1:87)
 2. Prince Edward Island (1:524)
 3. Nova Scotia (1:856)
 4. Quebec (1:1,017)
 5. Northwest Territories (1:1,376)

In the United States, the frequency of the surname was higher than national average (1:16,985) in the following states:
 1. Louisiana (1:979)
 2. Maine (1:1,579)
 3. New Hampshire (1:1,796)
 4. Massachusetts (1:1,871)
 5. Connecticut (1:4,509)
 6. Vermont (1:5,047)
 7. Rhode Island (1:6,014)
 8. Texas (1:12,139)

People
 Charles Cormier (1813–1887), Quebec businessman and political figure	
 Chris Cormier (born 1967), American professional bodybuilder
 Clarence Cormier (1930–2012), New Brunswick politician
 Clément Cormier (1910–1987), Canadian Priest, academic and the vice chancellor and founder of Université de Moncton
 Daniel Cormier (born 1979), American mixed martial artist	
 Ernest Cormier (1885–1980), Quebec engineer and architect 	
 Hyacinthe-Marie Cormier (1832–1916), French Dominican priest, 76th Master of the Order	
 J. P. Cormier (born 1969), Canadian singer-songwriter and multi-instrumentalist	
 Lance Cormier (born 1980), American baseball pitcher 	
 Len Cormier (1924–2008), U.S. aerospace industry	
 Liam Cormier (born 1980), Canadian musician
 Patrice Cormier (born 1990), Canadian ice hockey player	
 Rheal Cormier (1967–2021), Canadian-American baseball pitcher	
 Robert Cormier (1925–2000), American author, columnist, and newspaper reporter	
 Robert Cormier (colonist) (1610–1712), French colonizer, ship's carpenter and family founder	
 Robert De Cormier (1922–2017), American musical conductor, arranger, and director	
 Yvon Cormier (1938–2009), ring name "The Beast", Canadian professional wrestler

References

French-language surnames
Surnames of French origin